Rankings of universities in South Africa are largely based on international university rankings, since there are no South African rankings as of yet.

These international university rankings indicate that South Africa's university system is the strongest on the continent: it is home to five of the six highest ranked African universities, including the two campuses consistently ranked as academically strongest in Africa, University of Cape Town and University of the Witwatersrand.

Highly cited international university rankings
In part because of the inherent difficulty of ranking complex educational institutions, there are an expanding number of competing international university ranking schemes, each with a different emphasis. Four of the most prominent are the Times Higher Education World University Rankings (most widely accepted), The Centre for World University rankings (CWUR),QS World University Rankings, and the Academic Ranking of World Universities (ARWU, sometimes referred to as the "Shanghai Rankings").

Times Higher Education World University rankings

The Times Higher Education World University Rankings ranked the top South African universities as follows:

QS World University rankings
The 2021-22 edition of the QS World University Rankings ranked the top South African universities as follows:

Previous years' world rankings are as follows (before 2010 the ranking was known as the Times Higher Education-QS World University Rankings):

ARWU/Shanghai
The Academic Ranking of World Universities has ranked the top South African universities as follows:

Note: These are the only ranked South African universities.

Center for World University Rankings (CWUR)
The CWUR ranked the top South African Universities as follows:

International Rankings for Additional Context

University Ranking by Academic Performance (URAP)

URAP, which is a newer ranking scheme based solely on quantitative measures of academic productivity, includes data for a larger number of global universities, and thus gives an alternative view of the relative standing of more South African institutions. The 2020-2021 edition of URAP ranked the top South African Universities as follows:

Business-oriented rankings
Several international rankings schemes focus on the placement of graduates in business settings.

Times Higher Education Alma Mater Index
This is another THE ranking which aims to measure the real world success of a university's alumni by ranking Universities according to the number of their graduates that are currently CEOs of Fortune Global 500 companies. The global number one for 2017 is by a considerable margin, Harvard University. The only African University that appears on the Global top 100 is the University of the Witwatersrand. The 2017 South African rankings are as follows:

Tredence-Emerging Global Employability University Ranking
This is a global ranking of universities by the perceived quality of their graduates by top employers around the world. The only African university in the top 150 is the University of the Witwatersrand. The 2013 ranking is as follows:

Bloomberg Billionaire Ranking
This ranks universities according to their popularity among US based billionaires. The only ranked South African university is the University of the Witwatersrand. The 2014 ranking is as follows:

Additional context on South African higher educational institutions

2010 Centre for Higher Education Transformation report
A 2010 report by Centre for Higher Education Transformation identified 3 different university clusters in South Africa, grouped according to function.
The input variables used to group universities were:
 Percentage of headcount enrolment in science, engineering and technology
 Masters and doctoral enrolments
 Student to staff ratios
 Permanent staff with doctoral degrees
 Private and government income
 Student fee income

The output variables were:
 Student success rates
 Graduation rates
 Weighted research output units per permanent staff member
The Red cluster constitutes the top research-intensive universities. The Blue cluster consists of institutions focused primarily on technical training, while the Green cluster includes institutions which show characteristics of both missions. The clusters are:

References

https://web.archive.org/web/20160417014732/http://www.4icu.org/topAfrica/

See also
Rankings of business schools in South Africa
 College and university rankings

University and college rankings
Universities in South Africa
Rankings